The 2019 Slovak Open was a professional tennis tournament played on indoor hard courts. It was the 20th edition of the tournament which was part of the 2019 ATP Challenger Tour. It took place in Bratislava, Slovakia between 4 and 10 November 2019.

Singles main-draw entrants

Seeds

 1 Rankings are as of 28 October 2019.

Other entrants
The following players received wildcards into the singles main draw:
  Andrej Glváč
  Lukáš Klein
  Lukáš Lacko
  Alex Molčan
  Máté Valkusz

The following player received entry into the singles main draw as an alternate:
  Sasikumar Mukund

The following players received entry from the qualifying draw:
  Zdeněk Kolář
  Illya Marchenko

Champions

Singles

 Dennis Novak def.  Damir Džumhur 6–1, 6–1.

Doubles

 Frederik Nielsen /  Tim Pütz def.  Roman Jebavý /  Igor Zelenay 4–6, 7–6(7–4), [11–9].

References

2019 ATP Challenger Tour
2019
2019 in Slovak tennis
November 2019 sports events in Europe